Karin Elisabeth Dreijer (born 7 April 1975) is a Swedish singer-songwriter and record producer. Dreijer was one half of the electronic music duo the Knife, formed with their brother Olof Dreijer. Dreijer released their debut solo album under the alias Fever Ray in January 2009. Their second studio album, Plunge, under the same alias, was released in October 2017.

Dreijer's vocal style is notable for both shrill and deep tones, and also the use of multitracked vocals with the use of pitch-shifting technology. Visually, they employ the use of masks, face and body paint, intricate costumes, and other theatrical elements in photo shoots, videos and live performances, during which they often perform behind a gauze screen that partially obscures the audience's view.

Early life
Dreijer was born on 7 April 1975 in Gothenburg, Sweden. They started playing guitar at the age of ten, which led to the founding of the band Honey Is Cool in 1994. Before pursuing a career in music, Dreijer worked as a web designer. In 1998, they moved to Stockholm.

Career

The Knife

Karin and their brother Olof Dreijer formed the electronic music duo the Knife in Gothenburg in 1999. The Knife released their eponymous debut album in 2001. The duo gained a wider international recognition following the release of "Heartbeats", the lead single of their second studio album, Deep Cuts (2003). The duo performed live for the first time in 2006, when they went on the Silent Shout Tour in support of their third album of the same name (2006). In 2009, the duo were commissioned alongside Mt. Sims and Planningtorock by the Danish performance group Hotel Pro Forma to compose an opera, titled Tomorrow, in a Year, which is based on Charles Darwin's On the Origin of Species. In 2013, the band released their fourth and final studio album, Shaking the Habitual. The duo disbanded in November 2014, after completing the Shaking the Habitual Tour.

Solo work
While the Knife were on hiatus, Dreijer released their self-titled solo debut album under the alias Fever Ray. It was released digitally on 12 January 2009 and physically on 18 March 2009 through Rabid Records. The album was preceded by its lead single "If I Had a Heart" (2008), which was used in numerous television series, including Person of Interest, Breaking Bad and Wentworth, as well as the opening theme song for the Canadian-Irish historical drama television series Vikings.

In September 2009, Dreijer composed the soundtrack to Dirty Diaries, a collection of feminist pornographic short films. In a review of the collection, Swedish newspaper Smålandsposten described the soundtrack as appropriate for the film, though repetitive.

Dreijer performed as Fever Ray at the 2010 Coachella Festival and received positive reviews. In September of the same year, they performed at Electric Picnic in Ireland.

Contrary to a statement from the film's director, Dreijer did not make a cameo appearance in the 2011 film Red Riding Hood. However, the soundtrack features a new track performed by Dreijer as Fever Ray, "The Wolf", as well as "Keep the Streets Empty for Me" from their debut album. "The Wolf" was also featured in Ubisoft's Far Cry Primal announcement trailer, as well as during the game's final mission.

Dreijer wrote the music for the theatrical adaptation of Ingmar Bergman's 1968 horror film Hour of the Wolf, which premiered at Stockholm's Royal Dramatic Theatre on 12 March 2011. One of these tracks, "No Face", appeared in demo form on the 2012 compilation album We Are the Works in Progress, organised by Blonde Redhead to benefit victims of the 2011 Japanese tsunami.

In February 2016, Dreijer announced they had written and produced music for a theater play called Vahák (English: Violence), which plays on themes of colonial and homophobic violence. That same month, Dreijer revealed in an interview with The Fader that they were working on solo music, though they were unsure whether it will be under the Fever Ray moniker.

On 20 October 2017, Dreijer released the single "To the Moon and Back" and its accompanying music video. It served as the lead single to their second studio album, Plunge, which was released on 27 October without prior announcement. The album received widespread acclaim from music critics upon release and appeared on numerous year-end lists. In support of the album, Dreijer embarked on an international tour throughout 2018, with the first leg of which was held in Europe and began in February, followed by a North American leg held in May. More European dates were later added from June until November.

In the 2018 Swedish Grammys, Dreijer and the producers they collaborated with on Plunge won the award for "Producer of the Year". Plunge was also nominated for Best European Independent Album at the IMPALA awards.

On March 10, 2023, Fever Ray released their third album, Radical Romantics, on Rabid Records.

Collaborations
In 2005, Dreijer supplied vocals on the track "What Else Is There?" by Röyksopp on the album The Understanding. The song charted highly, raising Dreijer's profile at an early stage of their career. They also appeared in the video for that single, but not as the vocalist, who was portrayed by the Norwegian model Marianne Schröder. In 2008, Dreijer provided vocals for the Deus song "Slow" from the band's Vantage Point album. Dreijer was featured on the tracks "This Must Be It" and "Tricky Tricky" again by Röyksopp, appearing on their 2009 album Junior. On 6 September 2019, a collaborative EP between Björk, Dreijer (credited as Fever Ray), and the Knife titled Country Creatures was released. It contains remixes of Björk's song "Features Creatures" by Dreijer and by the Knife as well as a remix of Dreijer's "This Country" by Björk.

Influences
When producing and presenting a radioprogram for Swedish Sveriges Radio in June 2004 about the state of music and what it was like to be a musician in the 21st century, Dreijer chose a list of songs including, "I Don’t Give A" by Peaches, "Legs" by PJ Harvey, "We Don't Play Guitars" by Chicks On Speed, "Disconnect" by Plastikman, "I’m Dancing In The Show Tonight" by Ween, "Running Up That Hill" by Kate Bush, "Meet Sue Be She" by Miss Kittin, "Ensam Tempo" by Jenny Wilson, "Kiss Them for Me" by Siouxsie and the Banshees,  "Tha" by Aphex Twin, "Panty Lies" by Sonic Youth and "On Guard" by Le Tigre.

Personal life
Dreijer largely keeps their private life outside the headlines, but in 2017, they told The Guardian in an interview that they had been married and had dropped Andersson from their name following their divorce. In the same interview, they described themself as "definitely a queer person, but [...] very gender-fluid." Dreijer uses the pronouns they/them in English and hen in Swedish. They have two daughters.

Awards and nominations
{| class="wikitable sortable plainrowheaders" 
|-
! scope="col" | Award
! scope="col" | Year
! scope="col" | Category
! scope="col" | Nominee(s)
! scope="col" | Result
! scope="col" class="unsortable"| 
|-
! scope="row"|AIM Independent Music Awards
| 2018
| Best Sophomore Release
| Plunge
| 
|
|-
! scope="row" rowspan=2|Antville Music Video Awards
| rowspan=2|2009
| rowspan=2|Best Cinematography
| "If I Had a Heart"
| 
|rowspan=2|
|-
| "When I Grow Up"
| 
|-
! scope="row"|Berlin Music Video Awards
| 2018
| Best Song
| "To the Moon and Back"
| 
|
|-
! scope="row"|Camerimage
| 2010
| Best Music Video
| "Stranger Than Kindness"
| 
|
|-
! scope="row"|Musikförläggarnas Pris
| 2018
| Composer of the Year
| rowspan=10|Themself
| 
| 
|-
!scope="row" rowspan=4|P3 Guld Music Awards
| rowspan=3|2010
| Best New Artist
| 
| rowspan=3|
|-
| Best Dance
| 
|-
| Best Pop
| 
|-
| 2019
| Guldmicken
| 
| 
|-
! scope="row" rowspan=5|Rober Awards Music Prize
| rowspan=3|2009
| Best Female Artist
| 
|
|-
| Best European Artist
| 
|
|-
| rowspan=2|Best Electronica
| 
|
|-
| rowspan=2|2017
| 
|rowspan=2|
|-
| Best Female Artist
| 
|-
! scope="row" rowspan=2|UK Music Video Awards
| rowspan=2|2009
| rowspan=2|Best Indie/Alternative Video
| "If I Had a Heart"
| 
|rowspan=2|
|-
| "When I Grow Up"
|

Discography

Albums

Studio albums

Remix albums

Live albums

Extended plays

Singles

As lead artist

As featured artist

Guest appearances

As Karin Dreijer

As Fever Ray

Music videos

References

External links

 
  Fever Ray discography at Discogs
 
 

1975 births
20th-century Swedish singers
21st-century Swedish singers
Ambient musicians
English-language singers from Sweden
Feminist musicians
Intelligent dance musicians
Swedish LGBT singers
Swedish LGBT songwriters
Living people
Masked musicians
Mute Records artists
Queer singers
Queer songwriters
Singers from Gothenburg
People from Nacka Municipality
Swedish electronic musicians
Swedish feminists
Swedish record producers
Swedish singer-songwriters
Trip hop musicians
Non-binary singers
Non-binary songwriters
Genderfluid people